Johnny Bratton, also known as Honey Boy Bratton, (September 9, 1927 – August 15, 1993) was an American professional boxer and briefly reigned as the NBA welterweight champion in 1951.  He fought many of the best fighters of his era in the division, earning nearly $400,000 in 83 fights, but ended up penniless and mentally impaired.

Amateur career 
Bratton started boxing at age 14 and competed in several Golden Gloves events before turning pro.

Professional career 
Bratton was a strong character, contemporaneously described as "flashy" or "egotistical", with his "brilliantined hair and a fondness for purple shirts". He was "instinctively disliked by others" and fans were said to hope he would "get a beating".

He turned pro in 1944 and captured the vacant National Boxing Association World welterweight title in 1951 with a majority decision win over Charley Fusari , fight in which Fusari was down for a four-count in the 4th round and a nine-count in the 10th.  He lost the belt two months later to Kid Gavilán (often written "Kid Gavilan" at the time) by decision after Bratton's jaw was broken within the first five rounds.  In 1953 Bratton rematched Gavilan for the World Welterweight Title and lost a lopsided decision with scores 85-65, 83-67, 82-68 all for Gavilan.  After the loss to Gavilan, Bratton's career spiraled downward with losses to Johnny Saxton and Chico Varona.  He retired in 1955 after a brutal loss to Del Flanagan, a fight stopped by the ring doctor because Bratton was cut over both eyes and appeared "dazed and didn't know where he was."

His career record was 60 wins (including 34 knockouts), 24 losses (three knockouts) and three draws.

At his peak, Bratton was earning tens of thousands of dollars per fight, and he spent lavishly, on clothes, cars and gambling. His manager, Howard Frazier, was found to be embezzling his income and had his license revoked for it in 1949.  Bratton attracted plenty of other people eager to relieve this Arkansas country boy of his new-found wealth, which - combined with poor financial management, by his father and others - meant that he ended up losing it all.

Personal life, Joanne and after boxing 
Bratton was born in Little Rock, Arkansas where his father was a preacher. He had older brothers named Jerry and Lawyer Jr. During the Great Depression, the family moved north to Chicago, where his father got a job as a taxi driver, which meant he was often away from home, and young Bratton grew up without strong family support, as his mother left him to his own devices. He attended DuSable High School, but dropped out, spending his time on the street, an existence that led him to the fight clubs that would be his path to success.

He married young - a local girl called Cleadora McLinn with whom he had a son, Dana, in 1944, but the marriage didn't last a year. Then, aged 18, Bratton met Joanne Jackson, aged only 15, a neighbour of his uncle. They went on to marry and had a son, Derek, known as Ricky, born in 1950.

The rigors of the boxing ring had taken a heavy toll, and in 1955, a few months after his final fight, Bratton was admitted to Manteno State Mental Hospital, where he would stay for eight years. On release, he lived quietly with his mother. He would spend time living in his car, then was homeless, and had ongoing mental problems and related hospital admissions. At times he worked as a farm-hand. When his son Ricky died of an infection aged 11, in Detroit, Bratton was too sick to be aware of it.

Bratton’s wife JoAnne Bratton-Jackson went on to be a force in the music business, specifically soul music.  With business partner and later husband Ed Wingate – already successful owner of The 20 Grand club and other businesses, she co-founded Detroit record labels that ran neck and neck with Motown. After Golden World Records, of which she was president, came Ric-Tic Records - named for her and Bratton’s son, Derek Bratton, and Wingate Records.  She co-wrote a number of soul records, including "That's What He Told Me" and the flip side "Holding Hands," (co-written with Bob Hamilton, and released on Ric-Tic in 1965, sung by Rose Batiste). Motown owner Berry Gordy sought a partnership with the couple early on, but Jackson counselled Wingate against, and the result was a string of hits and an eventual buy-out by Gordy for around a million dollars, in 1966.

In the 1980s, Bratton was sleeping in the lobby of Chicago's (formerly magnificent but now seedy) Del Prado Hotel, earning his place by running errands and being personable, but not quite living in the present, always a sidestep away from his old memories.  By 1991, he was in a nursing home on Chicago's South Side, in touch with his family and "doing all right", in his own words.

Bratton died in 1993, aged 65 and is buried at Mount Hope Cemetery in Chicago, Illinois.

Professional boxing record

References

External links 
 
 Nowhere to Run (A True Story of Johnny Bratton) by John Schulian. In 'At the Fights: American Writers on Boxing'

1927 births
1993 deaths
Sportspeople from Little Rock, Arkansas
Welterweight boxers
World welterweight boxing champions
World boxing champions
American male boxers